
Year 765 (DCCLXV) was a common year starting on Tuesday (link will display the full calendar) of the Julian calendar. The denomination 765 for this year has been used since the early medieval period, when the Anno Domini calendar era became the prevalent method in Europe for naming years.

Events 
By place

 Europe 
 King Pepin III ("the Short") restores the papal privileges (see Donation of Pepin) in Benevento and Tuscany territory (and partially in Spoleto).
 The Annals of Tigernach tell of a shortage of bread in Ireland. 

 Britain 
 King Æthelwald of Northumbria is deposed at Pincanheale, possibly at a gathering of his own magnates. He is succeeded by Alhred, a distant cousin of the late king Oswulf.

 Abbasid Caliphate 
 The Zenata Berber tribe of Banu Ifran rebels against the Abbasid Caliphate, and creates an independent state centered around Tlemcen (modern Algeria). Their tribal chief Abu Qurra rebuilds the city (formerly, the Roman colonia Pomaria).

 By topic 

 Agriculture 
 European writings make the first known mention of a three-field system in use in medieval Europe. The crop rotation is the practice of growing a series of different types of crops in the same area in sequential seasons. Under this system, the land of an estate or village is divided into three large fields, and makes a given section of land productive 2 years out of 3, instead of every other year (approximate date).

Births 
 Ali al-Ridha, Shī‘ah Imām and Muslim scholar (d. 818)
 Fastrada, Frankish queen consort (d. 794)
 Han Hong, general of the Tang Dynasty (d. 823)
 Pei Du, chancellor of the Tang Dynasty (d. 839)

Deaths 
 September 27 – Pugu Huai'en, Chinese general during the Tang Dynasty
 Ceolwulf, king of Northumbria
 Domnall Midi, High King of Ireland
 Ealdwulf, bishop of Lindsey
 Eardwulf, king of Kent
 Flaithbertach mac Loingsig, High King of Ireland
 Fujiwara no Toyonari, Japanese politician (b. 704)
 Gao Shi, Chinese poet
 Gyeongdeok, king of Silla (Korea)
 Hemele, bishop of Lichfield
 Ja'far al-Sadiq, sixth Shī‘ah Imām and Muslim scholar (b. 702)
 Junnin, emperor of Japan (b. 733)
 Miao Jinqing, chancellor of the Tang Dynasty (b. 685)
 Stephen the Younger, Byzantine theologian (or 764)
 Telets, ruler (khagan) of the Bulgarian Empire
 Tello, bishop of Chur (approximate date)
 Wang Changling, Chinese poet and official (b. 698)

References